Heribert Trubrig (1 October 1935 – 5 March 2020) was an Austrian football defender. He played for Linzer ASK, and made 10 appearances for the Austria national football team.

References

External links 
 

1935 births
2020 deaths
Place of birth missing
Austrian footballers
Austria international footballers
Association football defenders
LASK players
SK Schärding players